The Fort Saskatchewan Traders were an ice hockey team in the Alberta Junior Hockey League.  They played in Fort Saskatchewan, Alberta, Canada, at the Jubilee Recreation Centre, capacity 2000.

Founded: 1976–77
Division titles won: 1983–84
Regular season titles won: 1983–84, 1990–91, 1992–93
League Championships won: 1979, 1984
Doyle Cup Titles: None
Royal Bank Cup Titles: None

History

The team's name comes from Fort Saskatchewan's history as a North-West Mounted Police fort, although it was not actually a trading fort, when it was originally settled in 1875.

In 1978–79, the Traders completed their most successful season in the AJHL, as they won the league championship, and then defeated the Richmond Sockeyes of the BCHL in the Vernon Cup (forerunner to the Doyle Cup) before falling to the eventual national champion Prince Albert Raiders in six games at the Centennial Cup finals.

The Traders fell upon hard times in their last years as financial difficulties and low attendance left the future of the Traders in doubt.  The Traders were reportedly sold to a group representing St. Albert during the 2005-06 season, however the deal failed to gain league approval.  Finally, on March 15, 2007, a deal to relocate the Traders to St. Albert for the 2007–08 season was approved, ending the Traders' 31-year run in Fort Saskatchewan. Only the Calgary Canucks have had a longer tenure in one city. Once relocated, the team was renamed the St. Albert Steel. The team relocated again after the 2011–12 season to Whitecourt where they became the Whitecourt Wolverines.

Season-by-season record

Note: GP = Games played, W = Wins, L = Losses, T/OTL = Ties/Overtime losses, SOL = Shootout losses, Pts = Points, GF = Goals for, GA = Goals against

Playoffs
1977 Lost Quarter-final
Red Deer Rustlers defeated Fort Saskatchewan Traders 4-games-to-2
1978 Lost Final
Fort Saskatchewan Traders defeated Edmonton Crusaders 4-games-to-3
First in semi-final round robin (3-1) vs. Calgary Canucks and St. Albert Saints
Calgary Canucks defeated Fort Saskatchewan Traders 4-games-to-none
1979 Won League, Won Alta/BC Championship, Lost Abbott Cup
Fort Saskatchewan Traders defeated Calgary Chinooks 4-games-to-none
Second in semi-final round robin (2-2) vs. Calgary Canucks and St. Albert Saints
Fort Saskatchewan Traders defeated Calgary Canucks 4-games-to-3 AJHL CHAMPIONS
Fort Saskatchewan Traders defeated Richmond Sockeyes (PJHL) 4-games-to-1 ALTA/BC CHAMPIONS
Prince Albert Raiders (SJHL) defeated Fort Saskatchewan Traders 4-games-to-2
1980 Lost Quarter-final
St. Albert Saints defeated Fort Saskatchewan Traders 3-games-to-none
1981 Lost Quarter-final
Sherwood Park Crusaders defeated Fort Saskatchewan Traders 3-games-to-none
1982 Lost Quarter-final
Fort McMurray Oil Barons defeated Fort Saskatchewan Traders 4-games-to-2
1983 Lost Quarter-final
Fort McMurray Oil Barons defeated Fort Saskatchewan Traders 4-games-to-none
1984 Won League, Lost Alta/BC Championship
Fort Saskatchewan Traders defeated Fort McMurray Oil Barons 4-games-to-none
Fort Saskatchewan Traders defeated St. Albert Saints 4-games-to-3
Fort Saskatchewan Traders defeated Red Deer Rustlers 4-games-to-none AJHL CHAMPIONS
Langley Eagles (BCJHL) defeated Fort Saskatchewan Traders 4-games-to-2
1985 Lost Semi-final
Fort Saskatchewan Traders defeated St. Albert Saints 4-games-to-2
Sherwood Park Crusaders defeated Fort Saskatchewan Traders 4-games-to-none
1986 Lost Quarter-final
Sherwood Park Crusaders defeated Fort Saskatchewan Traders 4-games-to-1
1987 Lost Quarter-final
Sherwood Park Crusaders defeated Fort Saskatchewan Traders 4-games-to-1
1988 Lost Quarter-final
Hobbema Hawks defeated Fort Saskatchewan Traders 4-games-to-2
1989 Lost Final
Fort Saskatchewan Traders defeated Lloydminster Blazers 4-games-to-2
Fort Saskatchewan Traders defeated Sherwood Park Crusaders 4-games-to-none
Red Deer Rustlers defeated Fort Saskatchewan Traders 4-games-to-1
1990 Lost Quarter-final
Lloydminster Blazers defeated Fort Saskatchewan Traders 4-games-to-3
1991 Lost Final
Fort Saskatchewan Traders defeated Sherwood Park Crusaders 4-games-to-none
Fort Saskatchewan Traders defeated Lloydminster Blazers 4-games-to-1
Calgary Royals defeated Fort Saskatchewan Traders 4-games-to-2
1992 Lost Semi-final
Fort Saskatchewan Traders defeated St. Albert Saints 4-games-to-3
Olds Grizzlys defeated Fort Saskatchewan Traders 4-games-to-1
1993 Lost Final
Fort Saskatchewan Traders defeated Sherwood Park Crusaders 5-games-to-4
Fort Saskatchewan Traders defeated St. Albert Saints 4-games-to-3
Olds Grizzlys defeated Fort Saskatchewan Traders 4-games-to-3
1994 Lost Quarter-final
St. Albert Saints defeated Fort Saskatchewan Traders 4-games-to-3
1995 DNQ
1996 Lost Quarter-final
Fort McMurray Oil Barons defeated Fort Saskatchewan Traders 4-games-to-none
1997 DNQ
1998 Lost Final
Fort Saskatchewan Traders defeated Lloydminster Blazers 4-games-to-none
Fort Saskatchewan Traders defeated Grande Prairie Storm 4-games-to-1
St. Albert Saints defeated Fort Saskatchewan Traders 4-games-to-2
1999 Lost Quarter-final
Lloydminster Blazers defeated Fort Saskatchewan Traders 4-games-to-3
2000 Lost Quarter-final
Fort Saskatchewan Traders defeated St. Albert Saints 3-games-to-1
Lloydminster Blazers defeated Fort Saskatchewan Traders 4-games-to-none
2001 Lost Preliminary
Grande Prairie Storm defeated Fort Saskatchewan Traders 3-games-to-2
2002 Lost Preliminary
Drayton Valley Thunder defeated Fort Saskatchewan Traders 3-games-to-none
2003 DNQ
2004 DNQ
2005 Lost Preliminary
Drayton Valley Thunder defeated Fort Saskatchewan Traders 3-games-to-none
2006 Lost Preliminary
Spruce Grove Saints defeated Fort Saskatchewan Traders 3-games-to-none
2007 Lost Final
Fort Saskatchewan Traders defeated Fort McMurray Oil Barons 4-games-to-none
Fort Saskatchewan Traders defeated Okotoks Oilers 4-games-to-1
Camrose Kodiaks defeated Fort Saskatchewan Traders 4-games-to-2

Notable alumni
The following former Traders have gone on to play in the NHL:

Traders who moved on to play for the Canadian Women's National & Olympic Teams:

Shannon Szabados

See also
 List of ice hockey teams in Alberta

References

External links 
Alberta Junior Hockey League website

Defunct Alberta Junior Hockey League teams
Defunct ice hockey teams in Alberta
Defunct junior ice hockey teams in Canada
Ice hockey clubs established in 1976
Fort Saskatchewan
1976 establishments in Alberta
2007 disestablishments in Alberta